160th (Welsh) Brigade or Brigâd 160 (Cymru), is a regional brigade of the British Army that has been in existence since 1908, and saw service during both the First and the Second World Wars, as part of the 53rd (Welsh) Infantry Division. It is a regional command responsible for all of Wales. The Brigade is also regionally aligned with the Eastern European and Central Asian regions as part of defence engagement.

Formation 
The Welsh Border Brigade was originally raised in 1908, upon creation of the Territorial Force, and was part of the Welsh Division. The brigade was composed of the 1st, 2nd and 3rd Volunteer battalions of the Monmouthshire Regiment along with the 1st Battalion of the Herefordshire Regiment.

First World War 
In 1915 the brigade was re-designated the 160th (1/1st South Wales) Brigade and the Welsh Division the 53rd (Welsh) Division. The brigade fought with the division in the First World War, in the Middle Eastern theatre.

The brigade was reconstituted as a result of British troops being sent to the Western Front during the emergency following the German March 1918 Spring Offensive.

Order of battle 

 1/1st Battalion, Monmouthshire Regiment (to February 1915)
 1/2nd Battalion, Monmouthshire Regiment (to November 1914)
 1/3rd Battalion, Monmouthshire Regiment (to February 1915)
 1/1st Battalion, Herefordshire Regiment (to 24 April 1915)
 2/4th Battalion, Queen's (Royal West Surrey Regiment) (from 24 April 1915 to 31 May 1918)
 1/4th Battalion, Royal Sussex Regiment (from 24 April 1915 to 30 May 1918)
 2/4th Battalion, Queen's Own (Royal West Kent Regiment) (from 24 April 1915 to 25 August 1918)
 2/10th Battalion, Duke of Cambridge's Own (Middlesex Regiment) (from 24 April 1914 to 19 August 1918)
 1/7th (Merionethshire & Montgomeryshire) Battalion, Royal Welsh Fusiliers (joined on 24 June 1918 from 158th (North Wales) Brigade)
 160th Machine Gun Company, Machine Gun Corps (formed 11 May 1916, moved to 53rd Battalion, Machine Gun Corps 25 April 1918)
 160th Trench Mortar Battery (formed 26 June 1917)
 21st Punjabis (from 26 May 1918)
 110th Mahratta Light Infantry (joined from Karachi on 28 June 1918, left for 20th Indian Brigade on 19 July)
 1st Battalion, Cape Corps (South African, joined 22 July 1918)
 17th Infantry (The Loyal Regiment) (from 6 August 1918)

Inter-war period 
After the war the brigade and division were disbanded as was the Territorial Force. However, both the brigade and division were reformed in 1920 in the Territorial Army. The brigade, now the 160th (South Wales) Infantry Brigade, was again composed of the same four battalions it had before the Great War. However, these were all posted to the 159th (Welsh Border) Infantry Brigade early in the 1920s and were replaced by the 4th, 5th, 6th and 7th Battalions of the Welch Regiment. The 6th and 7th Battalions were amalgamated as the 6th/7th Battalion, Welch Regiment and the 4th Battalion, King's Shropshire Light Infantry joined in the same year.

Second World War 
The brigade, now composed of two battalions of the Welch Regiment and one of the Monmouthshire Regiment, together with the rest of the 53rd (Welsh) Division, was mobilised in late August 1939 and soon afterwards Britain declared war on Nazi Germany. In April 1940 160th Brigade was sent to Northern Ireland and, after the British Expeditionary Force (BEF) was evacuated from France, the brigade was mainly involved in anti-invasion duties and exercises training to repel a potential German invasion of Northern Ireland. 160th Brigade, and the rest of the 53rd Division, were sent to Southeast England almost two years later, where they began training for the eventual Allied invasion of Northern France.

After another nearly two years spent in Kent training, the brigade, under the command of Brigadier Charles Coleman, with the rest of the 53rd Division, landed in Normandy as part of Operation Overlord (codename for the Allied invasion of Northwest Europe) in late June 1944, and were almost immediately involved in severe attritional fighting around the French city of Caen, facing numerous German panzer divisions, in what came to be known as the Battle for Caen. 160th Brigade later participated in the Second Battle of the Odon, sustaining heavy casualties, which resulted in the 1/5th Battalion, Welch Regiment being transferred to the 158th Brigade of the same division and replaced by the 6th Battalion, Royal Welch Fusiliers. The decision was made by the divisional commander, Major-General Robert Ross (a former commander of the brigade), due to an acute shortage of infantrymen in the British Army at this stage of the war, even more so in finding sufficient numbers of battle casualty replacements (or reinforcements) for three battalions of the same regiment all serving together in the same brigade, which, like 160th Brigade, had also suffered heavy losses.

The brigade went on to fight in the Battle of Falaise, capturing large numbers of German troops as prisoners of war (POWs) and the subsequent Allied advance from Paris to the Rhine, later playing a minor role in the Battle of the Bulge, a large role in Operation Veritable in February 1945 and crossing the River Rhine into Germany over a month later, where it took part in the Western Allied invasion of Germany, finally ending the war in Hamburg, Germany.

160th Brigade remained in Germany on occupation duties until it was disbanded in late 1946.

Order of battle 
160th Infantry Brigade was composed as follows during the war:

 4th Battalion, Welch Regiment
 1/5th Battalion, Welch Regiment (left 3 August 1944)
 2nd Battalion, Monmouthshire Regiment
 160th Infantry Brigade Anti-Tank company (formed 1 July 1940, disbanded 15 February 1941)
 6th (Caernarvonshire and Anglesey) Battalion, Royal Welch Fusiliers (from 4 August 1944)

Commanders 
The following officers commanded 160th Infantry Brigade during the war:

 Brigadier A.E. Williams (until 10 May 1940)
 Brigadier R.K. Ross (from 10 May 1940 until 17 September 1942)
 Brigadier E.E. Dorman-Smith (from 17 September 1942 until 22 November 1943)
 Lieutenant-Colonel C.F.C. Coleman (acting, from 22 November 1943 until 28 January 1944)
 Brigadier L.G. Whistler (from 28 January 1944 until 22 June 1944)
 Brigadier C.F.C. Coleman (from 22 June 1944 until 27 May 1945)
 Lieutenant-Colonel H.B.D. Crozier (acting, from 27 May 1945 until 3 June 1945)
 Brigadier C.F.C. Coleman (from 3 June 1945)

Post War 
Following the reformation of the Territorial Army after the end of the war, the brigade was reformed as the 160th (South Wales) Infantry Brigade on 1 April 1947.  The brigade was organised as a 'three-battalion' brigade with the 2nd Battalion, Monmouthshire Regiment in Pontypool, 4th (Carmarthenshire) Battalion, The Welch Regiment in Llanelli, and 5th (Glamorgan) Battalion, The Welch Regiment in Pontypridd under its command.  The brigade itself remained under the guise of the 53rd (Welsh) Infantry Division during this time.

Though the TA seemed stable in 1947, it was continually cut and reduced in size time and time again from 1950 onwards.  In 1961, the first wave of major cuts came when the old territorial divisions were merged with their local districts to become 'Division/Districts', thus the 53rd (Welsh) Infantry Division became the 53rd (Welsh) Infantry Division/District that year and the brigade became a regional brigade now just tasked with home defence.  As a result of the 1966 Defence White Paper, the TA was became the 'TAVR' (Territorial & Army Volunteer Reserve) and organised into four categories: TAVR I: those units tasked with quick-deployment support, ie: SAS and NATO-specific units; TAVR II: Units tasked with NATO-support and/or deployable as normal TA units were; TAVR III: Home defence infantry and light-equipment only units (reduced to cadres in 1969 and disbanded in 1975), and TAVR IV: Sponsored bands, UOTC, and miscellaneous units.

Following the above changes, the old Division/Districts were renamed as 'Districts', with the 53rd (Welsh) Division/District becoming Wales District and now oversaw all units within Wales, with the TA brigades disappearing shortly thereafter.  These changes caused little or no direction in doctrine and training from above the battalion level, thus creating a complicated atmosphere.

In 1967, with the Territorial Army reorganised, the brigade's battalions were completely reorganised too.  The 2nd Monmouths was disbanded and concurrently reconstituted as two units in TAVR II, B (South Wales Borderers) Company in the Welsh Volunteers based in Newport and in TAVR III, forming the whole unit, the Monmouthshire (Territorial) Battalion, The South Wales Borderers also based in Newport.  The 4th Welch was reduced to three companies: in TAVR II, C (Welch) Company in the Welsh Volunteers and in TAVR III, B and C Companies of the 4th (Territorial) Battalion of the Welch Regiment.  Finally, the 5th Welch was reduced to two units: in TAVR II, part of C (Welch) Company, and in TAVR III, B Company in Bridgend part of the 5th/6th (Territorial) Battalion, The Welch Regiment.  With the wholescale reductions of the TA, the fully territorial brigades and divisions were disbanded and the brigade soon followed suite.

Cold War 
In 1984, as a result of the 1981 Defence White Paper, many of the old disbanded territorial brigades were reformed as part of their respective regional districts.  These brigades were not like their predecessors however, as with the enhancement of the TA, the brigades became purely administrative headquarters for training.  As part of these changes, 160th (Welsh) Infantry Brigade was reformed as the operational formation of Wales District with its headquarters at The Barracks in Brecon.  The brigade's task was to protect Wales in its role of a home defence brigade.  If mobilised, the brigade would have been the 8th Regional AF Headquarters.

In 1989 the brigade's structure was as follows:

 160th (Wales) Brigade
 Brigade Headquarters, at The Barracks, Brecon
 1st Battalion, The Royal Regiment of Wales, at Battlesbury Barracks, Warminster (Light Infantry) – infantry demonstration unit at the School of Infantry
 3rd (Volunteer) Battalion, The Royal Welch Fusiliers (V), in Wrexham (Light Infantry, Home Defence)
 3rd (Volunteer) Battalion, The Royal Regiment of Wales (V), at Maindy Barracks, Cardiff (Light Infantry)
 4th (Volunteer) Battalion, The Royal Regiment of Wales (V), in Swansea (Light Infantry, Home Defence)
 104th Air Defence Regiment, Royal Artillery (V), at Raglan Barracks, Newport (64 x Blowpipe MANPADS)
 157th (Wales and Midlands) Transport Regiment, Royal Corps of Transport (V), at Maindy Barracks, Cardiff
 203rd (Welsh) General Hospital, Royal Army Medical Corps (V), in Cardiff (General Hospital)
By the end of the Cold War, the German Army (Bundeswehr) had a battalion-sized tank (panzer) training unit based at the Castlemartin Training Area in West Wales, which was within the brigade's geographical area.  The battalion was equipped with the Leopard 1 main battle tank and its personnel rotated through for gunnery and/or manoeuvre training.

After the end of the Cold War, the government published the Options for Change reform which saw several districts either merge or reduce in size, with some having both.  Wales District was part of this later group and on 1 April 1992 merged with West Midlands District to form the new Wales and Western District.  Following these changes, the brigade was moving under the new district which, in March 1995, was merged with North West District and consequently reduced to 5th Division in 1995.

Twenty-first century 
By 2003, the brigade was organised as follows:

 Brigade Headquarters, at The Barracks, Brecon
 Royal Welsh Regiment (Territorial Army; one battalion) – 3rd (Volunteer) Battalion, The Royal Welsh from 2007
 104th Regiment, Royal Artillery (Territorial Army; Air Defence)
 The Royal Monmouthshire Militia, Royal Engineers (Territorial Army)
 157th (Wales and Midlands) Logistic Support Regiment, Royal Logistic Corps (Territorial Army)
 Wales University Officer Training Corps (Territorial Army)

Army 2020 
Under the Army 2020 programme, the brigade was renamed as the 160th Infantry Brigade and Headquarters Wales, retaining its regional commitments, but now commanding several regular and territorial (becoming the Army Reserve in 2015) units.  By 2017, the brigade was organised as follows:

 Brigade Headquarters, at The Barracks, Brecon
 1st Battalion, The Royal Irish Regiment, at Clive Barracks, Tern Hill (Light Mechanised Infantry w/ Foxhound MRAPs)
 1st Battalion, The Rifles, at Beachley Barracks, Chepstow (Light Infantry)
 2nd Battalion, The Royal Irish Regiment (Army Reserve)
 6th Battalion, The Rifles (Army Reserve)
 160th Infantry Brigade & Headquarters Wales Cadet Training Team, at The Barracks, Brecon
 Clwyd and Gwynedd Army Cadet Force, at Kinmel Park Camp, Bodelwyddan
 Dyfed and Glamorgan Army Cadet Force, in Bridgend
 Gwent and Powys Army Cadet Force, in Powys

Under the Army 2020 Refine programme, the brigade dropped its operational commitments and became simply 160th (Welsh) Brigade, responsible for regional duties within the Principality of Wales.  Since 2019, the brigade has no operational units under its control, but does oversee cadets:

 160th Infantry Brigade & Headquarters Wales Cadet Training Team, at The Barracks, Brecon
 Clwyd and Gwynedd Army Cadet Force, at Kinmel Park Camp, Bodelwyddan
 Dyfed and Glamorgan Army Cadet Force, in Bridgend
 Gwent and Powys Army Cadet Force, in Powys

Footnotes

Bibliography 

 
 

160 (Wales) Brigade
British Army Regional Points of Command
B160
Military units and formations established in 1908
Infantry brigades of the British Army in World War I
Infantry brigades of the British Army in World War II